Sathyaraj is an Indian film actor and  media personality who has predominantly appeared in Tamil cinema. He started his career playing villains, supporting roles and character roles. Later, he played the lead in the film Kadalora Kavithaigal (1986). He also acted as Thanthai Periyar in the Tamil Nadu government-sponsored film Periyar (2007). He was also the director of the film Villadhi Villain (1995), starring himself in three different roles.

Apart from his film career, Sathyaraj has been vocal in the media about various issues, such as Sri Lankan Tamil nationalism and water rights in Tamil Nadu. In 2011, he had a brief career as a television host for the game show Home Sweet Home on STAR Vijay. He has also served as a brand ambassador for Pothys ,Sri Kumaran Jewelry Shop and AVR Jewellery Shop.

Films

As actor

1970s

1980s

1990s

2000s

2010s

2020s

As producer
 Lee (2007)
 Naaigal Jaakirathai (2014)
 Sathya (2017)

As director
 Villathi Villain (1995)

As narrator
Kaakha Kaakha (2003)
Santosh Subramaniam (2008)
Mahabalipuram (2014)

As singer

References

External links
 

Male actor filmographies
Indian filmographies
Director filmographies